Public Services and Procurement Canada (PSPC) is the department of the Government of Canada with responsibility for the government's internal servicing and administration.

The department is responsible for the procurement for other government departments and serves as the central purchasing agent, real property manager, treasurer, accountant, pay and pension administrator, integrity adviser and linguistic authority; it was recognized in 2018 as one of Canada's Best Diversity Employers. It is also the custodian of a large real estate portfolio and as well infrastructure such as bridges, dams and highways.

The department is responsible to Parliament through the minister of public services and procurement and receiver general for Canada – presently Helena Jaczek. Day-to-day operations and leadership of the department is overseen by the deputy minister, a senior civil servant.

Organization

Branches 
Acquisitions
Chief Information Officer Branch
Communications
Digital Services Branch
Defence and Marine Procurement
Finance and Administration
Human Resources
Integrated Services
Legal Services
Parliamentary Precinct
Pay Administration
Policy, Planning and Communications
Procurement
Real Property
Receiver General and Pension

Regions 
 Atlantic
 Quebec
 Ontario
 Western
 Pacific

Special operating agency 
 Translation Bureau

Phoenix Pay System 

The Phoenix Pay System is a payroll processing system for federal employees, run by PSPC. After coming online in early 2016, Phoenix has been mired in problems with underpayments, over-payments, and non-payments.  As of March 2018, the estimated cost to fix the problems was over $1 billion.

See also

 Government Electronic Directory Services

References

Notes

External links
 

1996 establishments in Canada
Federal departments and agencies of Canada
Canada
Ministries established in 1996
Canada
Canada